Bernadett Baczkó (born 8 January 1986 in Budapest) is a Hungarian judoka, who played for the lightweight category.

She is a nine-time national champion, and a five-time medalist at the European Junior Championships. She also won the bronze medal for the same division at the 2007 World Judo Championships in Rio de Janeiro, Brazil.

Baczko represented Hungary at the 2008 Summer Olympics in Beijing, where she competed for the women's lightweight class (57 kg). She reached only into the second preliminary round, where she lost by a waza-ari (half-point) to Hungarian-born Australian judoka and five-time Olympian Mária Pekli. Because her opponent advanced further into the semi-finals, Baczko offered another shot for the bronze medal by defeating Tunisia's Nesria Jelassi, with an automatic ippon and kuzure kesa gatame (seven mat holds), in the repechage bout. Unfortunately, she finished only in seventh place, after losing out the final repechage bout to France's Barbara Harel, who successfully scored a waza-ari, eighteen seconds before the five-minute period had ended.

References

External links
 
 NBC Olympics Profile

Hungarian female judoka
Living people
Olympic judoka of Hungary
Judoka at the 2008 Summer Olympics
Martial artists from Budapest
1986 births
21st-century Hungarian women